Maer Roshan is an American writer, editor and entrepreneur who has launched and edited a series of prominent magazines and websites, including FourTwoNine.com, TheFix.com, NYQ, Punch!,  Radar Magazine and Radaronline.com. He currently serves as Editor-in-Chief of Los Angeles Magazine. Previously he was Deputy Editor of New York, Editorial Director of Talk and Senior Editor of Interview. He has written for The New York Times, the Miami Herald, New York, The New Republic, The Advocate, Details and Harper's Bazaar.

Early life
Maer Roshan was born to an Iranian Jewish father and American mother. Roshan moved to New York in 1979 with his mother and siblings, shortly after the Islamic Revolution. His father fled Iran 7 years after and died after arriving in the United States. He began his media career in 1989 after graduating from NYU as a crime reporter at the Key West Citizen and launched his first magazine, the gay weekly QW in 1991, at the height of the AIDS crisis, recruiting a prominent group of writers and editors including Andrew Solomon and David Rakoff. The magazine's coverage of politics and culture earned it a General Excellence Award from the Alternative Press Association. Soon after, Time Inc. hired him to create a national gay glossy, Tribe.

Career
In 1994 Roshan was hired by Kurt Andersen as Deputy Editor of New York. He went on to produce some of the magazine's most high-profile features, including the first interview with  Donatella Versace after the murder of her brother, Gianni Versace, and the first post-impeachment interview with Monica Lewinsky. In 2003 he was awarded an Emmy for his work as Executive Producer of the New York Awards, a televised special that aired on NBC.

Later that year Tina Brown appointed Roshan as Editorial Director of Talk magazine. Following an editorial overhaul, he was credited  by Adweek with "turning around the struggling publication, doubling circulation in ten months . Brown called him "the only real natural male magazine editor of his generation."

But the magazine's trajectory was interrupted by the 9/11 terrorist attacks, which devastated the advertising market. In January 2002  afterTalk suspended publication,  Roshan gathered aides from New York and Talk and started Radar' an irreverent monthly about politics and pop culture.

Hailed by The New York Times as the year's most anticipated launch, Radar's first two test issues sold out across the country. Soon after, the magazine disappeared from the newsstands while Roshan searched for more long-term funding. Fourteen months later Roshan raised a reported $10 million from businessmen Mort Zuckerman and Jeffrey Epstein, and secured further backing from Integrity Multimedia, a company funded by billionaire Ron Burkle. Under his leadership, Radar became one of the first print publications to include online media. After attracting 1.5 million unique visitors a month after its debut, Radaronline was cited by The Wall Street Journal as a new model for print magazines struggling to adapt to a new media environment.

In May 2008, Radar was nominated for a General Excellence award by the American Society of Magazine Editors. Soon after, Radaronline was purchased by American Media. The site currently attracts 100 million unique visitors a month.

In April 2011 Roshan launched TheFix.com, a daily website that is currently the leading addiction and recovery portal in the world. In 2012, he started a Los Angeles-based consultancy called Awesome Projects. which provides editorial services to companies including The New York Times'', Yahoo!, Snapchat, The Hollywood Reporter and Telepictures. In 2016 he signed on as Chief Content Officer of FourTwoNine, a national gay-focused magazine and website.

References

External links
Maer Roshan Profile/Newsday
Maer Roshan Interview/Black Table
Radar Review/ Media Life
Maer Roshan interview
 Profile/Baltimore Sun

1967 births
Living people
Iranian Jews
Jewish American writers
American male writers
American LGBT writers
21st-century American Jews